Neocyrtophoeba is a genus of parasitic flies in the family Tachinidae. There is one described species in Neocyrtophoeba, N. heyrovskyi.

Distribution
Peru.

References

Monotypic Brachycera genera
Diptera of South America
Dexiinae
Tachinidae genera